Possible Cube is an album by Chicago Underground Trio which was recorded in 1999 and released on the Delmark label.

Reception

In his review for AllMusic, Michael G. Nastos states: "the trio weaves in and out of improvisations and written passages quite effectively and holds a certain degree of interest if one pays close attention. ... This second recording from the Trio shows no lack of imagination or resolve, though the pure musical content might leave some creative music listeners wanting for the third, hopefully breakthrough effort that must come from these talented, challenged sonic explorers".

Adam Shatz of The New York Times wrote: "This graceful collage of free jazz and art rock has refreshingly little in common with the electric jazz of Miles Davis, whose ghost tends to hover over such experiments. Instead of looking to funk for inspiration, the trio delves into the ethereal textures of modern electronica. And the astonishing thing is that the record doesn't sound like an experiment. Where most jazz-rock fusions feel awkwardly hyphenated, this one is naturally hybrid."

The Wire included the album in their "1999 Rewind" listing the 50 best albums of the year.

Track listing
All compositions by Rob Mazurek except where noted
 "Othello" (Chad Taylor) – 8:58
 "Shaw Town" (Mazurek, Taylor, Kupersmith) – 3:26
 "O Balanco" – 1:09
 "Nude Anthem" – 3:52
 "The Enormous Room" – 4:20
 "Pisces" (Taylor) – 3:21
 "Into Another You" (Taylor, Kupersmith, Mazurek, Jeff Parker) – 14:21
 "Pássaros" – 0:42
 "O Sino" – 1:13
 "LMNO" – 2:12
 "Munir E Salete" – 1:48
 "Teletransportation Unit 3" (Kupersmith, Mazurek, Parker) – 4:55
 "Future Ancestors" (Taylor) – 5:17
 "Energia" (Taylor, Kupersmith, Mazurek) – 1:45
 "Arthur Na Igreja" – 0:36
 "Leonardo" – 0:31
 "La Jetée" (Parker) – 5:20

Personnel
Rob Mazurek – cornet, electronics, vibraphone, Vietnamese marimba, organ
Noel Kupersmith – bass, vibraphone
Chad Taylor – percussion, vibraphone
Jeff Parker – acoustic guitar, organ (tracks 2, 7 & 12)

References

1999 albums
Chicago Underground Trio albums
Delmark Records albums